The 2017–18 Burkinabé Premier League is the 56th edition of top flight football in Burkina Faso. It began on 20 October 2017 and ended on 10 June 2018.

Final standings

See also
2018 Coupe du Faso

References

Premier League
Premier League
Burkina Faso
Burkinabé Premier League seasons